Igma (possibly from Quechua for widow) is a   mountain in the Huanzo mountain range in the Andes of Peru. It is situated in the Apurímac Region, Antabamba Province, Oropesa District, and in the Cusco Region, Chumbivilcas Province, Santo Tomás District. Igma lies north of the mountain Chancohuana, northeast of Huayunca and southeast of Atuncollpa.

References

Mountains of Peru
Mountains of Apurímac Region
Mountains of Cusco Region